The men's time trial at the 1997 UCI Road World Championships was held on Thursday October 9, 1997, in San Sebastián, Spain, over 43.8 km.

Final classification

References

Men's Time Trial
UCI Road World Championships – Men's time trial